Ricardo Antonio Merlo (born 25 May 1962 in Buenos Aires) is an Italian politician, leader of the Associative Movement Italians Abroad. Born and resident in Argentina, he acquired Italian citizenship through Jus sanguinis.

Biography
Graduated in Political Science at the University of Salvador in Buenos Aires, Ricardo Antonio Merlo completed his studies in Italy at the University of Padua.

Between 1998 and 2003, he was elected member of the General Council of Italians Abroad in Buenos Aires and then, in 2004, he was elected president of COMITES in Buenos Aires. In 2005, he served as president of the Intercomites Argentina.

In the Italian general election of 2006 he was elected deputy for the first time in the foreign constituency of the Chamber with the Italian Associations in South America (AISA), a political movement founded by Luigi Pallaro in 2005.

In 2007 he founded the Associative Movement Italians Abroad (MAIE), through which he was re-elected deputy in the general elections of 2008 and 2013. In the general election of 2018 he was elected senator and voted the confidence to the Conte Cabinet, so on 12 June 2018 he was appointed Undersecretary of the Ministry of Foreign Affairs and International Cooperation.

Honours and awards 
 : Commander Grand Cross of the Order of the Polar Star (13 November 2018)

References

1962 births
Living people
People from Buenos Aires
Universidad del Salvador alumni
Senators of Legislature XVIII of Italy
Deputies of Legislature XVII of Italy
Deputies of Legislature XVI of Italy
Deputies of Legislature XV of Italy